The minister of defence is a minister in the government of New Zealand with responsibility for the New Zealand Defence Force and the Ministry of Defence.

The present minister is Andrew Little, a member of the Labour Party.

History
Initially, military affairs in New Zealand were controlled by the British-appointed governor, without input from the New Zealand Parliament, which was only established in 1853. There was no minister of defence as such, as the governor retained control over all armed forces in the colony. However, senior military officers did serve as members of the Executive Council. Three such appointments were made: Lieutenant Colonel Robert Wynyard, Major General Thomas Simson Pratt, and Lieutenant General Duncan Alexander Cameron.

In 1863, under the premiership of Alfred Domett, a minister for colonial defence was appointed. Reader Wood, a former militia officer, became the first minister. This post continued to exist with only brief interruption until Edward Stafford's short-lived premiership of 1872, in which no defence minister was appointed. As a consequence of the New Zealand Wars, the defence portfolio was considered closely linked to the post of Minister of Native Affairs — on occasion, the latter post was formally titled "Minister of Native Affairs and Defence". It was not until the premiership of Robert Stout in 1884 that a separate minister of defence was formally appointed, and not until 1887 that the post was given to someone who was not simultaneously minister of native affairs. Until 1896 the responsibility for the New Zealand Police rested with the minister of defence before being allocated to the minister of justice instead.

During World War II, the post was supplemented by several others — a minister of national service (conscription), a minister of supply and munitions, a minister in charge of war expenditure, and a minister of armed forces and war co-ordination. All were part of the special War Cabinet, but only the first was a member of the regular domestic Cabinet.

List of defence ministers
Key

See also
Ministry of Defence (New Zealand)
Defence Diplomacy

References

External links
New Zealand Ministry of Defence

Defence